The Canal de Huningue is a canal in eastern France connecting the Rhine at Huningue to Niffer. The locks are no longer operational, but the canal is navigable from Niffer until Kembs.

The canal was enlarged in 1961 between Grand Canal d'Alsace and Mulhouse.  At the same time, the canal between Mulhouse and Friesenheim was closed to traffic as it had been duplicated by the Grand Canal d'Alsace.  Parts of the abandoned line are being restored.

See also
 List of canals in France

References

Huningue
Canals opened in 1828